Andreas Wechelus (fr. André Wechel, died 1581) was a printer and bookseller active in Paris from 1554 to 1573 and in Frankfurt from 1573 to 1581.

Biography 
In 1554, Andreas Wechelus took over the printing office of his father, Chrétien Wechel, on Saint-Jean-de-Beauvais Street. He continued the editorial work initiated by his father and printed texts in Greek, notably the works of Xenophon and Lucian), as well as those of humanists like  Jean-Antoine de Baïf and Pierre de Ronsard.

In all likelihood, Wechelus was a supporter of the Reformation, but his friends were German Lutherans, rather than French Calvinists. Nonetheless, he printed the works of Petrus Ramus and Nicolas Durand de Villegagnon.

In 1572, Wechelus escaped the St. Bartholomew's Day massacre thanks to his tenant Hubert Languet, a representative of Augustus, Elector of Saxony. Not long after, Wechelus left Paris for Frankfurt, where he died in 1581.

Books edited and printed 
 Pierre de La Ramée. . 1555. 
 Jean-Antoine de Baïf. .  1558. 
 Pierre Ronsard. La paix. 1559.
 Nicolas Durand de Villegagnon. . 1561.
 Jacques Androuet du Cerceau. . 1561.  .
 Jacques Grévin. . 1569.
 Anton Schneeberger. Medicamentorum facile parabilium adversus omnis generis articulorum dolores enumeratio. Frankfurt, 1581.

References

Notes

Bibliography 
 Renouard, Philippe. Répertoire des imprimeurs parisiens, libraires, fondeurs de caractères, et correcteurs d'imprimerie depuis l'introduction de l'imprimerie à Paris (1470) jusqu'à la fin du seizième siècle. Paris: Minard, 1965.
 Schwarzfuchs, Lyse. Le livre hébreu à Paris au XVIe siècle: inventaire chronologique. Paris, Bibliothèque nationale de France, 2004.

French editors
French printers
1581 deaths